Jeremy Haroldson (born ) is an American politician and Republican member of the Wyoming House of Representatives, representing the 4th district since January 12, 2021.

Career
Haroldson serves as lead pastor for Impact Ministries, an Assemblies of God affiliated Pentecostal church. Haroldson serves as chairman of the Platte County Chamber of Commerce. On August 18, 2020, Haroldson defeated incumbent state representative, Dan Kirkbride, in the Republican primary for the Wyoming House of Representatives seat representing the 4th district. On November 3, 2020, Haroldson was elected to this position, unopposed. Haroldson is set to be sworn in on January 4, 2021.

Personal life
Haroldson lives in Wheatland, Wyoming.

References

Living people
American Assemblies of God pastors
Republican Party members of the Wyoming House of Representatives
People from Wheatland, Wyoming
21st-century American politicians
Year of birth missing (living people)